K17DL-D (channel 17) is a low-power tourist information–formatted television station in Branson, Missouri, United States. It is owned by Branson Visitors TV, LLC, a joint venture between Gray Television (50.1%) and Market Branson, LLC (49.9%); Gray's interest makes K17DL-D a sister station to Springfield-based NBC affiliate KYTV (channel 3), ABC affiliate KSPR-LD (channel 33), and CW affiliate KYCW-LD (channel 25). K17DL-D's transmitter is located on US 160 in western Taney County.

History
The original construction permit to construct a low-power station on channel 17 in Branson was issued on March 3, 1993 and issued the call sign K17DL; on May 16, 1994, original owner Lorianne Crook-Owens sold the station to GEP, Inc. On July 26, 1999, K17DL, along with K05JQ (channel 5, now defunct) and Springfield-based K15CZ (channel 15, now KSPR-LD), was sold to Miller Family Broadcasting. By this point, channel 17 had come on the air through a series of special temporary authority grants and was simulcasting UPN programming with K15CZ; the station was fully licensed on January 14, 2002. Miller sold K17DL and K15CZ to Schurz Communications, owner of KYTV, on March 14, 2002. After UPN and The WB closed down to form The CW in 2006, K17DL and K15CZ affiliated with the new network.

On May 20, 2009, Schurz sold a 49.9-percent interest in K17DL to Market Branson for $250,000; following the sale, the station dropped CW programming (moving to LD2) and began carrying tourist information. The station also converted to digital television and began broadcasting in high definition; consequently, the call sign was modified to K17DL-D on May 29, 2009. Schurz' remaining 50.1-percent interest in channel 17 is included in Gray Television's purchase of Schurz' television stations.

Subchannels
The station's signal is multiplexed:

References

External links

17DL-D
Low-power television stations in the United States
Television channels and stations established in 2002
Gray Television
The CW affiliates
2002 establishments in Missouri
Branson, Missouri micropolitan area